Komang Ayu Cahya Dewi (born 21 October 2002) is an Indonesian badminton player affiliated with Djarum Badminton Club. She was invited to be part of Indonesia's national badminton team in 2020.

Personal Life
Dewi has 2 brothers, Gede Agus Setiadi and Kadek Bayu Kusuma.

In 2021, she won silver at the XX National Sports Week, losing to Saifi Rizka Nurhidayah  at the final, making her the first badminton medalist from Bali since the inception of the event.

Achievements

BWF International Challenge/Series 
Women's singles

  BWF International Challenge tournament
  BWF International Series tournament

References 

2002 births
Living people
People from Bali
Sportspeople from Bali
Indonesian female badminton players